Aqkand is a city in East Azerbaijan Province, Iran.

Aqkand or Aq Kand, also rendered as Ak-Kend, may also refer to various places in Iran:
 Aq Kand, Charuymaq, East Azerbaijan Province
 Aqkand-e Qareh Khezer, East Azerbaijan Province
 Aqkand-e Samaraq, East Azerbaijan Province
 Aq Kand, Kabudarahang, Hamadan Province
 Aq Kand, Razan, Hamadan Province
 Akh Kand, Divandarreh, Kurdistan Province
 Aqkand, West Azerbaijan
 Aq Kand-e Baruq, West Azerbaijan Province
 Aq Kand, Zanjan, Zanjan Province
 Aq Kand, Mahneshan, Zanjan Province
 Aq Kand, Qareh Poshtelu, Zanjan County, Zanjan Province